Carlos Vidal Layseca (4 February 1931 – 24 September 2017) was a Peruvian physician. He led the Ministry of Health from 1990 to 1991 and later served as rector of Cayetano Heredia University between 1994 and 1999.

References

1931 births
2017 deaths
People from Lima
Peruvian Ministers of Health